Philippine Science High School Central Mindanao Campus (PSHS-CMC) is the second Mindanao campus of the Philippine Science High School System, a specialized public high school in the Philippines. It caters to scientifically and mathematically gifted high school students from all over the country especially those in Mindanao. It is located in Nangka, Baloi, Lanao del Norte.

History
On November 5, 1996, a bill was passed in the House of Representatives by then Representative of 2nd District Lanao del Norte, Hon. Abdullah “Dabs” Mangotara and finally was signed into law by virtue of Republic Act No. 8461 dated January 19, 1998. This is an “Act Establishing the Philippine Science High School – Lanao del Norte Campus and Appropriating Funds Therefore”. The original site is at Mt. Torong-Torong, Tubod, Lanao del Norte.

On June 1, 1998, a memorandum of agreement (MOA) was entered into by the PSHS-LNC/PSHS System represented by Dr. Vicenta F. Reyes, Department of Science and Technology (DOST) represented by Secretary William G. Padolina and Lanao del Norte Provincial Government represented by Governor Imelda Quibranza Dimaporo for the realization of the establishment of the science high school. It was stipulated in the MOA that the Provincial Government will
 provide a site and building and motor vehicle
 provide a trust fund of 4.5 million to pay for stipends, book allowances, transportation costs, salaries of teachers and employees for the initial year of operations
 ensure the safety of scholars, faculty and administrative staff assigned.

Lanao del Norte Campus formally opened on July 1, 1998, housed temporarily at Maranding Central Elementary School in Maranding, Lala, Lanao del Norte. It started with only one classroom, a small office served as faculty room and two small dormitories to accommodate the 26 pioneering scholars coming from the municipalities of the province. The administration was composed of five faculty members — Jose Marlon A. Caumeran Richard B. Jumawan, Dulce Corazon Kenady, Franklin L. Salisid and Teodulo Miranda — and three administrative staff — Lucia Cielito A. Gillamac, Gerard M. Santos, and Elena C. Pasahingue-Marmes. Flor M. Temple, SST IV from PSHS-Diliman Campus was detailed as officer-in-charge of the campus until a director was appointed. On October 29, 1998, Prof. Ciriaco M. Gillera, Ph.D. of MSU-IIT, was appointed campus director on secondment status.

The Provincial Government of Lanao del Norte was able to release 2.3 million to cover Personal Services (PS) and Maintenance and Other Operating Expenses for July–December 1998. Effective January 1, 1999, the operational cost of the campus was included in the 1999 General Appropriations Act including the 16 million budget for the construction of academic and dormitory buildings 1 phase 1.

The DOST WIDE Bids and Awards Committee conducted the bidding on construction when the House Bill 1190, transfer of site from the Municipality of Tubod to Balo-i, Lanao del Norte took effect. In December 2000 the project was awarded to PIRRA Construction and Enterprises of Bocaue, Bulacan.

With the increasing number of scholars, faculty and staff, there was a need for more classrooms and spaces for science laboratories, dormitories and other instruction facilities. The provincial government let the school use the second floor, Main Stadium Building at Mindanao Civic Center, Tubod as temporary site from April 2001 to March 2007 while the construction of Academic and Dormitory Building in Nangka, Balo-i was in progress.

After eight years, PSHS-CMC has transferred to its permanent site at Nangka, Balo-i, Lanao del Norte although building construction is not yet completed and no perimeter fence yet constructed. Since Academic Building I is up to concrete works and roofing only, temporary walls and partitions are installed using coconut lumber and plywood. The mosque which was in front of the Academic Building was removed through negotiations with municipal officials and imams. For security reasons, the intern-scholars are temporarily housed at TESDA Dormitory which is 5 km from the campus.

Mindanao Civic Center (MCC)

The Mindanao Civic Center in Tubod, Lanao del Norte was the temporary site for this campus. During its stay at the MCC, the director's office was on the second floor, MCC Grandstand. The Staff Room, Faculty Room, Computer Laboratory, Accounting Office, Cashier and Boys' Dormitory were on the right wing of the grandstand, while the Chemistry Laboratory, Physics Laboratory, Biology Laboratory, Girls' Dormitory, Girls' Dormitory Annex and I-Ruby on the other wing. The Library, Technology Area and I-Jade was on the first floor. The other rooms were on the side of the MCC Gymnasium. The rooms at the side facing the Grandstand were III-Potassium, II-Rosal, IV-Neutron, I-Emerald and II-Dahlia. On the opposite side of the gym were the sections III-Lithium, IV-Proton, II-Kamia, III-Sodium and IV-Electron. School year 2006–2007 was the last at this site.

Transfer to permanent site
The school year 2007–2008 was the first school year that classes were conducted in the campus' permanent site. During the transfer, only the academic building and a small canteen were present. The dormitories were not finished so the dormitory was temporarily at TESDA, Ditucalan, Iligan City. The students were transported via school bus. Currently, there is a new canteen beside the boys' dormitory inside the campus and a gymnasium.

Implementation of the K+12 program
Starting school year 2012–2013, PSHS-CMC, along with all the other campuses of the PSHS system, implemented the K+12 program. All freshmen during the school year will get an additional two years of secondary education, with stronger focus on learning specialized branches of sciences and mathematics. The freshmen under the program started out as Grade 7 and will finish high school with Grade 12. It was the aim that the additional two years would better prepare students emotionally and psychologically to take up subjects such as mathematics and the research discipline that require “more maturity.”

Admission and sections 
Admission to the PSHS-CMC is possible only for the first year and, in uncommon cases, lateral entry in the second and third years. Applicants from grade six (or grade seven) must take and perform well in the National Competitive Examination (NCE), the admission test of the Philippine Science High School System, indicating their interest in the Central Mindanao Campus.

(NCE) Tests 
 Abstract Reasoning
 Mathematics
 Science
 English

Sections
Before S.Y 2020-2021, each batch (year level) is typically composed of 90 students divided equally in 3 Sections, Updated to 120 Students with 4 sections after S.Y 2020-2021. The new sections being G7 Diamond, G8 Sampaguita, then G9 Rubidium; With G10, G11, & G12 still having 90 Students as of S.Y 2022-2023.

Grade 7 
 Ruby
 Jade
 Diamond
 Emerald

Grade 8 
Dahlia
Kamia
Rosal
Sampaguita

Grade 9 
 Potassium
 Lithium
 Sodium
 Rubidium

Grade 10 
 Electron
 Neutron
 Proton

Grade 11 
 Andromeda
 Orion
 Pegasus

Grade 12 
 Baltazar
 Nebres
 Zara

Academic grading system 
Grades are reported in terms of the stanine. 1.00 is the highest grade while 5.00 is a failing mark. 2.50 is the passing grade and any grade lower than this is 'substandard'. The student's current standing for a subject is calculated by adding 1/3 of the previous quarter's grade and 2/3 of the tentative grade of the quarter. The GWA (general weighted average) of the student should be 2.25 or better to be in good standing.

Stanine 

Note: The percentage range is used in actual computations of grades while the equivalent rank is used in translating the grades for use outside of the system (e.g., application to colleges/universities).

Director's List
A scholar who earns a general weighted average of at least 1.50 at the end of each quarter is included in an honor roll known as the "Director's List".

Governance
The PSHS Central Mindanao Campus is one of the campuses of the PSHS System which is under the administrative supervision of the Department of Science and Technology (DOST). The PSHS System Board of Trustees (BOT) is the Governing Board of all the campuses under the PSHS System.

The BOT is chaired by the DOST Secretary, with the Secretary of the Department of Education as vice-chair. The members are the UP President, the PSHS System Executive Director, the Director of the Science Education Institute (SEI), the President of the PSHS National Alumni Association, the chairpersons of the congressional committees in the science and technology of the Senate and the House of Representatives, and one representative from each from higher education, education of the gifted, agriculture, and new emerging technologies.

Student Body and Campus Organizations

The school has several campus organizations, all under the umbrella of the student body.
The student body is named Supreme Council of Scholars, or SCS, and it is in charge of the Student's Week, Acquaintance Party and Sorting, Socialization, and others.

SMART or Science and Mathematics Association for Responsible Teenagers is the organization concerned with SMT related activities, including the Science Camp (SciCamp), Quarterly Quiz Bowl, and the Weekly Pop Quiz.

The SCS hosted five clubs — ELITE, GLOBE, SIPA, PASTEL, and Ad Libitum from 2014 to 2015. The ELITE was the club for computer enthusiasts and is supposed to be but did not become an autonomous club like the SCS and SMART. The GLOBE or Great Lovers of Best Entertainment was for the performers, further divided into singing, dancing, and theatre. The SIPA (Sporty Individuals with Positive Attitude) was the sports club; PASTEL is the arts club; and the Ad Libitum was the expressionists club.

The SCS hosts the Leagues, in which scholars are grouped into four (patterned from the Houses of Hogwarts, Harry Potter). At first the Leagues were named A, B, C, and D, then Red, Yellow, Blue, and Green, respectively. The League names progressed into Red Dragons, Yellow Flares, Blue Fawkes, and Green Gryphons.

The SCS and SMART have their Constitutional Committees or ConCom which works each organization's Constitution. A COMELEC is present for each organization. The SCS and SMART have a group of students called Facilitators that help the officers during events such as the SciCamp and Student's Week.

By 2015, It was decided that the 5 Clubs — ELITE, GLOBE, SIPA, PASTEL, and Ad Libitum, were to be disbanded, there were many reasons such as Academic Pressure, Club Members rarely met, in extreme cases met only 4 months, people don't often attend on clubs, etc.; all the reasons it was disbanded and It was replaced by ALA (Alternative Learning Activity), which was considered a Curricular Activity compared to the 5 now disbanded Clubs which were considered Extracurricular, also ALAs were made mandatory to join; However there is a supervising teacher, but compared to the Disbanded Clubs the ALAs were more organized.

SCS and SMART remained when the 5 clubs were disbanded as they were autonomous.

In 2017, amid Controversy during a student event, the Campus Administration at that time and disbanded all Student Body (Autonomous) Organizations —  SCS, SMART, and Events thus culminating in a hiatus, and freeze of student events and gathering for 2 years until the change of Campus Director and Administration that the Student Body Organizations were reintroduced.

As of 2022, The Leagues were reintroduced during S.Y 2019-2020 and SCS/SMART Functions were reintroduced.

References

External links
PSHS Central Mindanao Campus official website

Philippine Science High School System
Schools in Lanao del Norte